9903 Leonhardt, provisional designation , is a dark asteroid from the outer region of the asteroid belt, approximately 10 kilometers in diameter.

The asteroid was discovered on 4 July 1997, by American amateur astronomer Paul Comba at Prescott Observatory in Arizona, United States. It was named after Dutch keyboard player Gustav Leonhardt.

Orbit and classification 

Leonhardt orbits the Sun in the outer main-belt at a distance of 2.4–3.8 AU once every 5 years and 5 months (1,982 days). Its orbit has an eccentricity of 0.24 and an inclination of 2° with respect to the ecliptic.

Physical characteristics

Diameter and albedo 

According to the surveys carried out by the Infrared Astronomical Satellite IRAS and NASA's Wide-field Infrared Survey Explorer with its subsequent NEOWISE mission, Leonhardt measures 17.8 and 8.499 kilometers in diameter, respectively. WISE/NEOWISE also gives an albedo of 0.042 for the body's surface. It has an absolute magnitude of 14.5.

Lightcurves 

As of 2017, the asteroid's rotation period and shape remain unknown.

Naming 

This minor planet was named for Gustav Leonhardt (1928–2012), a Dutch conductor and harpsichordist, who founded the Leonhardt Baroque Ensemble. He was known for his many international concert tours and for his large number of recorded baroque works. The official naming citation was published by the Minor Planet Center on 2 April 1999.

The main-belt asteroid 12637 Gustavleonhardt, discovered during the second Palomar–Leiden Trojan survey campaign in 1973, is also named in his honor.

References

External links 
 Asteroid Lightcurve Database (LCDB), query form (info )
 Dictionary of Minor Planet Names, Google books
 Asteroids and comets rotation curves, CdR – Observatoire de Genève, Raoul Behrend
 Discovery Circumstances: Numbered Minor Planets (5001)-(10000) – Minor Planet Center
 
 

009903
Discoveries by Paul G. Comba
Named minor planets
19970704